Entomophthora is a fungal genus in the family Entomophthoraceae. Species in this genus are parasitic on flies and other two-winged insects. The genus was circumscribed by German physician Johann Baptist Georg Wolfgang Fresenius (1808-1866) in 1856.

This fungus is parasitic and undergoes a number of stages within its life cycle, these include; infection, incubation, sporulation and mummification. Within each stage, this pathogen invades the host’s body cells, utilising the insect’s nutrients allowing it to take control over the brain just before the host’s death.

Entomophthora reproduces asexually through both budding and spores. When in the host’s body, the pathogen utilises budding as a form of growth. This is done through a fungus cell developing a bud (daughter cell) on the parent cell. The parent cell then replicates its DNA and provides the daughter cell with this DNA. The daughter cell is then able to detach itself from the parent cell resulting in multiplication of the fungus. Spores are another mechanism that is utilised as a method of reproduction; the spores act like seeds in that they will flourish when environmental conditions are appropriate and begin to grow hyphae – root like filaments. These hyphae then develop into the body of the fungus where the spores can be created once again and released into the environment to ensure further reproduction occurs again.

Similarly, spores are utilised as a method of transmission of this parasitic disease, when spores come in contact with the insect either through consumption or direct contact, the pathogen is able to infect the insect resulting in the beginning on the life cycle. The insect however has immune responses that fight against these parasites in order to defend themselves from infection. Hemocytes are the cells within the immune response that are able to detect the entry of a pathogen and initiate the immune response to kill the foreign particles within the insect.

Physical characteristics

Description 
Entomophthora is a type of fungal pathogen that is parasitic towards flies and other two-winged insects. When entered into a host’s body, the fungal pathogen begins to invade the body cells and take control of the hosts which, in turn results in death. This relationship between a host and an organism is called parasitism. the parasite lives off or within another organism, in this case the fly (host) and causes harm or even death to the host. Entomophthora outbreaks commonly occur in temperate regions often during spring and autumn. Spores are the cause infection of a host, this usually occurs in cool and humid conditions commonly in areas where flies rest.

Life cycle 
Infection occurs when an insect comes in contact with the Entomophthora pathogen. Once the insect has been infected, the fungal disease begins its transmission and development throughout the body, causing harm and soon death to the host. The stages in which this pathogen undergoes to impact the host and cause harm, is referred to its life cycle.

The first stage of the life cycle is infection, referring to the invasion of micro-organisms into a genome, these micro-organisms are foreign to the body. Within this stage, the host come in contact with a conidia – a type of reproductive spore through touch or ingestion. When the conidia is within the host’s body, it beings to germinate. Germination refers to the process in which an organism grows from a spore. Here, the conidia present within the body begins to produce hyphae, these act like the roots of the fungi as they grow and branch out within the body of the host. Ultimately initiating the spread of the pathogen throughout the insect.

The next stage of the pathogen’s life cycle is incubation; this is the period of time between the insect's first exposure to the pathogen and the occurrence of the first symptom. Within this period the internal hyphae combine digestive enzymes and utilise pressure to penetrate through a number of cuticle layers of the host. This allows for the spread of the pathogen throughout the whole body of the host, infecting the insects blood and tissue. The fungal cells are able to absorb water and nutrients from the hosts body ensuring the pathogen’s survival.

This initiates the third stage of the life cycle; sporulation. Within this stage, the fungal pathogen begins to reproduce, this is done through the formation of spores from vegetative cells and budding. These spores are then released within the insect and infect the membrane areas within the host’s abdominal cuticle. The disturbance of blood flow, tissue and abdominal cuticle causes the pathogen to enter its last stage of its life cycle. In the host, the appearance of this stage is apparent due to abdominal swelling creating a striped pattern that remains even after death.

The last stage of the Entomophthora life cycle is mummification of the cadaver, in which this stage causes death to the host. The pathogen has interrupted and overtaken the host’s main vital mechanisms for survival, so the host’s body is no longer able to function normally and defend itself against the pathogen or any other threats. The mycelium – a group of hyphae- is then able to grow within the brain, controlling the behavioural aspects of the fly. The infection of the fly’s brain allows the pathogen to gain control over the fly’s movements. The pathogen commonly forces the host to locate itself on a high point of a surface, straighten out its back legs and open its wings. This allows for the hyphae to maximise growth within the body of the host causing death. Once death has occurred, the pathogen then releases its spores out into the environment to allow for transmission and reproduction once again. The position in which the fly remains ensures that the release of spores is dispersed as widely as possible to ensure transmission to another insect.

Reproduction 
Reproduction refers to the process in which an offspring is formed via asexual reproduction or sexual reproduction. Asexual reproduction involves one parent, producing a genetically identical offspring, to the parent cell. Whereas sexual reproduction involves the meeting and fertilisation of gamete cells in order to produce a genetically different offspring. Fungi type organisms reproduce asexually through the release of diploid spores. Spores are micro unicellular cells that are released and dispersed into the environment in a mass of numbers to increase the likelihood of further development and growth of the fungus. As spores are very small in size, they are easily moved via environmental conditions, that being wind, water, or even on an animal’s fur. These spores will find favourable conditions and successfully flourish, develop and grow into the structure and body of the fungi.

Development of the fungus via spores is initiated through germination; this marks the beginning of fungal development. Spores will begin to develop filaments called hyphae; these are root like structures of the fungi as they branch out into the environment absorbing any available water and other nutrients required for survival. Groups of hyphae will interconnect, forming the main fungal body, the mycelium. The fungi will soon develop a sporangiophore, this is the stalk/stem of the fungus. The sporangiophore is an elongated structure that provides support to the body of the fungus and creates spores. This is done through a process in which the haploid nucleus – a nucleus with half the number of chromosomes for that species – is encased in an outer membrane with a cytoplasm. The haploid nucleus within the sporangiophore fuses with the cytoplasm to create diploid nuclei (spores) – a nucleus with the normal number of chromosomes for a specific species -. These spores then travel through the sporangiophore where they reach the sporangium. The sporangium is the structure within the fungi that is reliant on storing spores. The rupturing of the sporangium releases a large mass of spores into the environment, this enable the fungi to reproduce rapidly.

Fungal species are also able to reproduce asexually via budding. Budding refers to the process in which an offspring is formed from a parent cell. This occurs for Entomophthora cells already within a host. When environmental conditions are favourable, a fungus cell develops a small growth on the cell body, this is referred to as the bud. The bud will enlarge over time, utilising the nutrients from the parent cell, which in turn ultimately causes growth. The parent cell replicates its DNA through the process of DNA replication – a process in which DNA undergoes a number of steps to formulate a copy of itself during cell division, creating genetically identical DNA to the parent cell-. Once the DNA is replicated within the nucleus, the nucleus then divides. One copy of the nucleus moves into the bud, and the other nucleus remains in the parent cell. When the daughter cell (bud) reaches a certain size, it detaches from the parent cell via cytokinesis. Cytokinesis refers to a process in which the cytoplasm within a cell splits, separating two cells. During budding cytokinesis occurs to separate the daughter cell from the parent cell. Once the daughter cell is detached from the parent cell, it will grow and mature into a large cell and will be able to develop its own bud and hence reproduce.

Transmission 
Transmission refers to the transfer of pathogens – disease causing agents – from an infected individual to a group or to another individual. There are two modes of transmission that cause infection, that being direct or indirect contact with a pathogen. Direct transmission refers to a pathogen passing directly from organism to organism, this can be in the form of direct contact (skin to skin contact, kissing, sexual intercourse, etc.) or from droplet spread (coughing, sneezing, talking). Whereas indirect transmission refers to a transfer of a pathogen through air particles, inanimate objects and animate intermediaries, more specifically vehicles, vectors and airborne transmission. Airborne transmission occurs when pathogens are carried via dust or droplet nuclei suspended in the air. Inanimate objects can transfer pathogens through vehicles. As infectious agents can be included in food, water, blood, etc. these can be transported around via the vehicle, ultimately indirectly exposing different locations to pathogens. Animate intermediaries refer to vectors, these are organisms that carry the pathogen but are not infected by the pathogen, for example a mosquito can carry malaria and can infect individuals with malaria, however the mosquito itself does not have malaria.

Entomophthora is a fungal pathogenic disease, in order for this species to infect other organisms the pathogen must come in contact with the insect’s body. Fungal transmission occurs through the movement of microscopic reproductive spores through the environment. These spores are released out into the environment via the rupturing of a sporangium. Once the release of spores occurs, their movement is dependent on environmental conditions, more specially, being blown through wind, passing through water streams etc. Spores will continue to travel through the environment until they come in contact with an insect where the organism will become infected, and the pathogen’s life cycle will begin. Contact occurs through the ingestion of spores or interaction between the pathogen and the external body of the insect. This is indirect transmission as the pathogen is airborne, travelling through the air until it comes in contact with an organism. Fungi transmission can also be transmitted directly through contact between insects, ultimately transferring spores from an infected insect to a non-infected insect. Entomophthora has been looked into by humans as a form of biological control against flies that are pest insects; however the transmission occurs through direct transmission between flies and attempts to artificially culture the fungus failed.

Once an insect is infected with the Entomophthora pathogen, it soon begins its life cycle. If successful the pathogen will invade the bodily cells of the host, germinate and reproduce within the host’s body until the pathogen reaches the last stage of its life cycle. This stage is where the insect dies, the pathogen remains within the host’s body producing and releasing spores into the environment. Further allowing the transmission of the pathogen to other organisms, to ultimately maximise infection of the Entomophthora disease throughout the two-winged insect population.

Insect Immunity 

The immune system refers to the organs and tissues that are utilised within the body in order to provide resistance and protection against infection. All living organisms have an immune system and mechanisms in order to protect themselves from foreign pathogens and molecules that they come in contact with. As flies are a small and simple organism, they do not have such a complex immune system like humans, however they still are able to defend themselves to some extent against pathogens. Flies have only an innate immunity, this means having a defence mechanism that is not specific to any pathogen that enters the body. Within a fly immune system, there are a number of enzymes and proteins they are able to use in order to defend themselves against foreign pathogens.

Entomophthora is a parasitic disease, when entered into the body, the immune response is initiated when hemocyte receptors interact with foreign molecules.  The recognition of a pathogen within the body triggers the immune response to occur within the area of the infected site. Hemocytes are cells within the immune system of invertebrates found within the hemolymph. These cells travel to the infected site when the immune response is triggered and begin to form a barrier like structure around the foreign parasite. Lamellocytes – effector cells – bind to the pathogen and create many cell layers until a capsule is formed around the fungus. Cytotoxic products are released into the capsule in order to kill the invading fungus. However, if the fungal pathogen is able to withstand this stress, it has the ability to continue its life cycle, causing death to the host.

Classification 

Living organisms are categorised within groups of similar species, this process is determined by scientists and is called biological classification. Within the six kingdoms of classification – plants, animals, archaebacteria, eubacteria, fungi and protists - Entomophthora is within the Fungi kingdom. The Fungi kingdom is then divided into five groups – Chytridiomycota. Zygomycota, Ascomycota, Basidiomycota and Glomeromycotan – this pathogen falls under the phylum of Zygomycota. Entomophthora then falls under more precise groups, more specifically; subphylum group of Entomophthoromycotina, the order Entomophthorales, the family of Entomophthoraceae, then the genus Entomophthora. The genus group is then divided into the species where there are a number of types of Entomophthora that range in genetic characteristics.

Taxonomy
The genus name of Entomophthora is derived from 2 words in the Greek, entomon meaning 'insect' and phthora which means 'destroyer'. The word entomon also means 'cut up into sections' which also describes the segments seen in insects.

Species
As accepted by Species Fungorum;

Entomophthora arrenoctona 
Entomophthora bereshkovaeana 
Entomophthora blissi 
Entomophthora brevinucleata 
Entomophthora bullata 
Entomophthora byfordii 
Entomophthora calliphorae 
Entomophthora chromaphidis 
Entomophthora cimbicis 
Entomophthora cleoni 
Entomophthora coleopterorum 
Entomophthora colorata 
Entomophthora culicis 
Entomophthora destruens 
Entomophthora dissolvens 
Entomophthora egressa 
Entomophthora erupta 
Entomophthora exitialis 
Entomophthora ferdinandii 
Entomophthora grandis 
Entomophthora helvetica 
Entomophthora hylemyiae 
Entomophthora inexpectata 
Entomophthora israelensis 
Entomophthora jassi 
Entomophthora lauxaniae 
Entomophthora leyteensis 
Entomophthora muscae 
Entomophthora oehrensiana 
Entomophthora pelliculosa 
Entomophthora philippinensis 
Entomophthora phryganeae 
Entomophthora planchoniana 
Entomophthora plusiae 
Entomophthora pooreana 
Entomophthora pseudococci 
Entomophthora punctata 
Entomophthora pustulata 
Entomophthora pyralidarum 
Entomophthora reticulata 
Entomophthora richteri 
Entomophthora rivularis 
Entomophthora scatophaga 
Entomophthora schizophorae 
Entomophthora schroeteri 
Entomophthora simulii 
Entomophthora sphaerosperma 
Entomophthora staritzii 
Entomophthora syrphi 
Entomophthora thripidum 
Entomophthora trinucleata 
Entomophthora weberi

Former species
Almost are all family Entomophthoraceae, unless noted;

 E. acaricida  = Apterivorax acaricida, Neozygitaceae
 E. adjarica  = Neozygites adjaricus, Neozygitaceae
 E. americana  = Furia americana
 E. anglica  = Zoophthora anglica
 E. anisopliae  = Metarhizium anisopliae, Clavicipitaceae
 E. aphidis  = Zoophthora aphidis
 E. aphrophorae  = Zoophthora aphrophorae
 E. apiculata  = Batkoa apiculata
 E. aquatica  = Erynia aquatica
 E. atrosperma  = Tarichium atrospermum
 E. aulicae  = Entomophaga aulicae
 E. batkoi  = Entomophaga batkoi
 E. blunckii  = Pandora blunckii
 E. brahminae  = Pandora brahminae
 E. calopteni  = Entomophaga calopteni
 E. canadensis  = Zoophthora canadensis
 E. caroliniana  = Eryniopsis caroliniana
 E. carpentieri  = Conidiobolus carpentieri, Ancylistaceae
 E. cicadina  = Massospora cicadina
 E. conglomerata  = Entomophaga conglomerata
 E. conica  = Erynia conica
 E. coronata  = Conidiobolus coronatus, Ancylistaceae
 E. creatonoti  = Furia creatonoti
 E. crustosa  = Furia gastropachae
 E. curvispora  = Erynia curvispora
 E. cyrtoneurae  = Tarichium cyrtoneurae
 E. delphacis  = Pandora delphacis
 E. delpiniana  = Erynia delpiniana
 E. dipterigena  = Pandora dipterigena
 E. dysderci  = Batkoa dysderci
 E. echinospora  = Pandora echinospora
 E. elateridiphaga  = Zoophthora elateridiphaga
 E. floridana  = Neozygites floridanus, Neozygitaceae
 E. forficulae  = Zoophthora forficulae
 E. fresenii  = Neozygites fresenii Neozygitaceae
 E. geometralis  = Zoophthora geometralis
 E. gigantea  = Batkoa gigantea
 E. gloeospora  = Pandora gloeospora
 E. gracilis  = Erynia gracilis
 E. grylli  = Entomophaga grylli
 E. henrici  = Erynia henrici
 E. ignobilis  = Conidiobolus obscurus, Ancylistaceae
 E. jaapiana  = Tarichium jaapianum
 E. jaczewskii  = Erynia jaczewskii
 E. kansana  = Entomophaga kansana
 E. lageniformis  = Neozygites lageniformis, Neozygitaceae
 E. lampyridarum  = Eryniopsis lampyridarum
 E. lecanii  = Neozygites lecanii, Neozygitaceae
 E. longispora  = Eryniopsis longispora
 E. major  = Batkoa major
 E. megasperma  = Tarichium megaspermum
 E. montana  = Furia montana
 E. muscivora  = Pandora muscivora
 E. nebriae  = Erynia nebriae
 E. neri  = Neozygites fresenii, Neozygitaceae
 E. obscura  = Conidiobolus obscurus, Ancylistaceae
 E. occidentalis  = Zoophthora occidentalis
 E. ovispora  = Erynia ovispora
 E. papillata  = Batkoa papillata
 E. parvispora  = Neozygites parvisporus, Neozygitaceae
 E. phalangicida  = Pandora phalangicida
 E. phytonomi  = Zoophthora phytonomi
 E. porteri  = Zoophthora porteri
 E. radicans  = Zoophthora radicans
 E. rhizospora  = Erynia rhizospora
 E. rimosa  = Entomophthora schroeteri
 E. saccharina  = Entomophaga saccharina
 E. sepulchralis  = Erynia sepulchralis
 E. tabanivora  = Entomophaga tabanivora
 E. tenthredinis  = Entomophaga tenthredinis
 E. terrestris  = Pandora terrestris
 E. tetranychi  = Neozygites tetranychi''', Neozygitaceae
 E. thaxteriana  = Conidiobolus obscurus, Ancylistaceae
 E. tipulae  = Entomophaga tipulae E. turbinata  = Neozygites turbinatus, Neozygitaceae
 E. variabilis  = Erynia variabilis E. vermicola  = Neoconidiobolus vermicola, Ancylistaceae
 E. virescens  = Furia virescens E. virulenta  = Neoconidiobolus thromboides'', Ancylistaceae

References

Zygomycota genera
Entomophthorales
Parasitic fungi